The Grandes Jorasses (4,208 m; 13,806 ft) is a mountain in the Mont Blanc massif, on the boundary  between Haute-Savoie in France and Aosta Valley in Italy.

The first ascent of the highest peak of the mountain (Pointe Walker) was by Horace Walker with guides Melchior Anderegg, Johann Jaun and Julien Grange on 30 June 1868. The second-highest peak on the mountain (Pointe Whymper, 4,184 m; 13,727 ft) was first climbed by Edward Whymper, Christian Almer, Michel Croz and Franz Biner on 24 June 1865, using what has become the normal route of ascent and the one followed by Walker's party in 1868.

The summits on the mountain (from east to west) are:
 Pointe Walker (4,208 m; 13,806 ft) – named after Horace Walker, who made the first ascent of the mountain
 Pointe Whymper (4,184 m; 13,727 ft) – named after Edward Whymper, who made the first ascent of this, the second-highest summit 
 Pointe Croz (4,110 m; 13,484 ft) – named after Michel Croz, a guide from Chamonix
 Pointe Elena (4,045 m; 13,271 ft) – named after Princess Elena
 Pointe Margherita (4,065 m; 13,337) – named after Queen Margherita
 Pointe Young (3,996 m; 13,110 ft) – named after Geoffrey Winthrop Young
 
 


North face
Located on the French side of the mountain, the north face is one of the three great north faces of the Alps, along with the north faces of the Eiger and the Matterhorn (known as 'the Trilogy'). One of the most famous walls in the Alps, it towers 1200 m (3,900 ft) above the Leschaux Glacier, stretching 1 km from end to end. The classic route on the face is the Walker Spur (Cassin/Esposito/Tizzoni, 1938, TD+/ED1, IV, 5c/6a, A1, 1200 m) which leads directly to the summit of Pointe Walker. The other major buttress on the mountain is the Croz Spur, which leads to the summit of Pointe Croz. In her solo ascents of the six most difficult north faces of the Alps, Alison Hargreaves chose this route in preference to the Walker Spur.

Reinhold Messner has stated, that he made the decision to ascend Mount Everest with Peter Habeler in the Grandes Jorasses, where Peter "descended like a dancer".

South face
On the Italian side of the mountain, the south face can be accessed from the Boccalatte cabin, above the hamlet of Planpincieux in the Italian Val Ferret, part of the Courmayeur municipality.

Summit ridge
From the Col des Hirondelles, the summit ridge connects Pt. Walker to the other summit points and then descends to the Col des Grandes Jorasses where a bivouac shelter is located - the Bivouac E Canzio hut. The ridge forms the French-Italian border, almost all of which is above 4,000 m (13,000 ft).

See also

List of 4000 metre peaks of the Alps
Planpincieux Glacier

References

External links
Grandes Jorasses on French IGN mapping portal
 

Alpine four-thousanders
France–Italy border
Great north faces of the Alps
International mountains of Europe
Mountains of the Alps
Mountains of Haute-Savoie
Mountains of Italy
Mont Blanc massif